Newspapers, radio, and television in Cedar Rapids, Iowa, United States.

Print

The Gazette is the primary daily newspaper for Cedar Rapids. The Cedar Rapids Gazette won a Pulitzer Prize in 1936, under editor Verne Marshall and primarily due to his efforts and articles, for its campaign against corruption and misgovernment in the State of Iowa.

Radio
Start dates are for the frequency/station license, not for callsign or programming that may have moved from license to license.

FM

AM

Television

Sources

Cedar Rapids, Iowa
Cedar Rapids, Iowa